"Whole Lotta Trouble" is a song by American singer-songwriter Stevie Nicks. The song was written by Nicks and Tom Petty and the Heartbreakers guitarist Mike Campbell. Released as a single in October 1989, the song reached  62 on the UK Singles Chart and No. 22 on the Irish Singles Chart. The song was last performed by Nicks on August 29, 2000, in San Diego, California. The song was nominated for the Grammy Award for Best Rock Vocal Performance, Female in 1990.

The song developed from an unreleased song by Nicks called "I Call You Missing" recorded in 1984. This track was recorded again during the Street Angel recording sessions, but it was never released.

Charts

References

External links
 The Other Side of the Mirror - Stevie Nicks | Songs, Reviews, Credits | AllMusic

1989 singles
1989 songs
EMI Records singles
Modern Records (1980) singles
Stevie Nicks songs
Song recordings produced by Rupert Hine
Songs written by Mike Campbell (musician)
Songs written by Stevie Nicks